James Farrar may refer to:

 James Farrar (poet) (1923–1944), English poet
 James Farrar (actor) (born 1987), English actor
 Jimmy Farrar (1950–2018), American singer, songwriter and musician

See also
James Farrer (disambiguation)